The American Legion Auxiliary (ALA) is a separate entity from the American Legion that shares the same values. Composed of spouses, mothers, daughters, granddaughters, and sisters of American war veterans. Founded in 1919, the ALA is dedicated to serving veterans, military, and their families.

History
After the end of World War I in 1918, 20 officers who had served in the American Expeditionary Forces  were asked to suggest ideas for improving troop morale. One officer, U.S. Army Lieutenant Colonel Theodore Roosevelt Jr., proposed an organization of veterans, the American Legion. After its formation in 1919, a number of existing women's organizations wanted to become the official affiliate of the Legion. The committee decided to create a new organization made up of the women most closely associated with the men of the Legion. This Auxiliary would perform those phases of Legion activities that were more suitably performed by women. In less than one year, 1,342 local units in 45 states of the Women's Auxiliary to the American Legion had been organized.

In 1954, the American Legion Auxiliary organized "Operation Book Swap" in which hardcover books were handed out to children in exchange for turning in ten comic books. This was largely a response to the publication and publicity of Fredric Wertham's book Seduction of the Innocent. The collected comics were then publicly burned or destroyed.

Eligibility
In 2019, the American Legion's National Convention voted to replace the word "wife" with "spouse" in the organization's constitution and bylaws section regarding eligibility to be a member of the American Legion Auxiliary; since then, male and female spouses of U.S. veterans have been eligible. Previously, only female spouses of U.S. veterans were.

Programs
The American Legion Auxiliary's mission outreach committees are Americanism, Children and Youth, Community Service, Education, ALA Girls Nation, Junior Activities, Legislative, National Security, Poppy, and Veterans Affairs and Rehabilitation.

ALA members who work these programs help provide scholarships to military children; bring veterans to classrooms; give young women leaders an opportunity to learn how the federal government works; allow girls to develop leadership skills through volunteer experiences and other activities; advocate for veterans by supporting legislative priorities that benefit them; promote the poppy to raise awareness and respect for veterans who have died; and host stand downs and other events to improve the lives of veterans in the community.

Notable Members
Cora M. Beach
Othilia Carroll Beals
Edith Bolte MacCracken
Sara E. Morse
Isabel Neill
M. Elizabeth Shellabarger
Rachel Applegate Solomon
Zatae Leola Longsdorff Straw
Vera Blanche Thomas

References

External links

American Legion Auxiliary Politicians at The Political Graveyard
American Legion entry in Encyclopædia Britannica

American Legion
Organizations established in 1919
Non-profit organizations based in Indianapolis